The Belmont Stakes is an American Grade I stakes race for three-year-old Thoroughbreds run at Belmont Park in Elmont, New York. It is run over 1.5 miles (2,400 m). The race, nicknamed The Test of the Champion, The Test of Champions and The Run for the Carnations, is the traditional third and final leg of the Triple Crown. It is usually held on the first or second Saturday in June, five weeks after the Kentucky Derby and three weeks after the Preakness Stakes. The 1973 Belmont Stakes and Triple Crown winner Secretariat holds the track record (which is also a world record on dirt) of 2:24.

The race covers one full lap of Belmont Park, known as "The Championship Track" because nearly every major American champion in racing history has competed on the racetrack. Belmont Park, with its large, wide, sweeping turns and long homestretch, is considered one of the fairest racetracks in America. Despite the distance, the race tends to favor horses with tactical speed: relatively few winners close from far behind the early leaders.

The attendance at the Belmont Stakes is among the American thoroughbred racing top-attended events. The 2004 Belmont Stakes drew a television audience of 21.9 million viewers, and had the highest household viewing rate since 1977 when Seattle Slew won the Triple Crown.

American Pharoah won the 147th Belmont Stakes in 2015, becoming the first horse to win the Triple Crown since Affirmed in 1978. Justify won the 150th Belmont Stakes in 2018 to become the 13th Triple Crown champion.

The 155th running of the Belmont Stakes will be held on Saturday, June 10, 2023.

History

1867–1929: Early years 

The first Belmont Stakes was held at Jerome Park Racetrack in The Bronx, built in 1866 by stock market speculator Leonard Jerome (1817–1891) and financed by August Belmont Sr. (1816–1890), for whom the race was named. The first race in 1867 saw the filly Ruthless win, while the following year was won by General Duke. The race continued to be held at Jerome Park until 1890, when it was moved to the nearby facility, Morris Park Racecourse. The 1895 race was almost not held because of new laws that banned bookmaking in New York: it was eventually rescheduled for November 2. The race remained at Morris Park Racecourse until the May 1905 opening of the new Belmont Park,  racetrack in Elmont, New York, on Long Island, just outside the New York City borough of Queens. When anti-gambling legislation was passed in New York State, Belmont Racetrack was closed, and the race was cancelled in 1911 and 1912.

The first winner of the Triple Crown was Sir Barton, in 1919, before the series was recognized as such. In 1920, the Belmont was won by the great Man o' War, who won by 20 lengths, setting a new stakes and American record, while under a stout pull.

Starting in 1926, the winner of the Belmont Stakes has been presented with August Belmont Trophy. The owner may keep the trophy for one year, and also receives a silver miniature for permanent use.

1930–2000: Evolution of the Triple Crown series 

The term Triple Crown was first used when Gallant Fox won the three races in 1930, but the term did not enter widespread use until 1935 when his son Omaha repeated the feat. Sir Barton was then honored retroactively. Since 1931, the order of Triple Crown races has been the Kentucky Derby first, followed by the Preakness Stakes, and then the Belmont Stakes. Prior to 1931, the Preakness was run before the Derby eleven times. On May 12, 1917, and again on May 13, 1922, the Preakness and the Derby were run on the same day. On eleven occasions, the Belmont Stakes was run before the Preakness Stakes. The date of each event is now set by the Kentucky Derby, which is always held on the first Saturday in May. The Preakness Stakes is currently held two weeks later; and the Belmont Stakes is held three weeks after the Preakness (five weeks after the Derby). The earliest possible date for the Derby is May 1, and the latest is May 7; the earliest possible date for the Belmont is thus June 5, and the latest is June 11. In 2020, due to the cancellation of the original dates due to the COVID-19 pandemic, the order changed with the Belmont first on June 20, the Kentucky Derby on September 5 and the Preakness on October 3—all with no spectators—before the Triple Crown races resumed their normal schedule in 2021.

In 1937, War Admiral became the fourth Triple Crown winner after winning the Belmont in a new track record time of 2:28 3/5. In the 1940s, four Triple Crown winners followed: Whirlaway in 1941, Count Fleet in 1943, Assault in 1946 and Citation in 1948. Count Fleet won the race by a then-record margin of twenty-five lengths. He also set a stakes record of 2:28 1/5, a record tied by Citation. In 1957, the stakes record was smashed when Gallant Man ran the Belmont in 2:26 3/5 in a year when the Triple Crown series was split three ways.

The Belmont Stakes race was held at Aqueduct Racetrack from 1963 to 1967, while the track at Belmont was restored and renovated.

The largest crowd of the 20th century was in 1971 with over 80,000 people, supplemented by the city's Latino community, there to cheer on their new hero, Cañonero II, the Venezuelan colt who had won the Kentucky Derby and Preakness Stakes and was poised to win the U.S. Triple Crown. However, due to a foot infection that had bothered the horse for several days, Cañonero II failed to win the Triple Crown when he struggled across the finish line in 4th place behind Pass Catcher, ridden by Walter Blum. Despite this loss, Cañonero II was named the winner of the first Eclipse Award for Outstanding Three-Year-Old Male Horse.

On June 9, 1973, Secretariat won the Belmont Stakes by thirty-one lengths in a record time of 2:24, becoming a Triple Crown champion, ending a 25-year gap between Citation, the Belmont and Triple Crown winner in 1948. Secretariat's record still stands as the fastest running of the Belmont Stakes and an American record for  miles on the dirt. In 1977, Seattle Slew became the first horse to win the Triple Crown while undefeated. Affirmed was the last winner of the Triple Crown in the 20th century, taking the Belmont Stakes in 2:26 4/5 on June 10, 1978. Ridden by eighteen-year-old Steve Cauthen, Affirmed defeated rival Alydar with Jorge Velásquez in the saddle. At the time the race was the third-slowest start and the third-fastest finish with the quarter in 25, the half in 50, 3/4 in 1:14, the mile in 1:37 2/5.

In 1988, Secretariat's son Risen Star won the Belmont in 2:26 2/5, then the second-fastest time in the history of the race. The next year, Easy Goer lowered the mark for second-fastest time to 2:26. Easy Goer also holds a Beyer Speed Figure of 122 for the race, the best of any Triple Crown race since these ratings were first published in 1987.

2001–present: Recent years 

For three years in a row, horses came to the Belmont Stakes with a Triple Crown on the line only to fail. In 2002, Belmont Park hosted what was then the largest crowd in its history when 103,222 saw War Emblem lose to longshot Sarava after stumbling at the start. In 2003, 101,864 watched Funny Cide finish third behind Empire Maker. In 2004, the attendance record was shattered when 120,139 people saw Smarty Jones upset by Birdstone.

In 2007, Rags to Riches became the first filly to win the race since Tanya in 1905. Three more failed Triple Crown bids followed: in 2008, Big Brown lost to Da' Tara; in 2012, I'll Have Another was withdrawn due to injury; and in 2014, California Chrome was beaten by Tonalist. This fueled debate about whether the series needed to be changed, for example by lengthening the period between races.

American Pharoah won the 2015 race, becoming the 12th horse in history to win the Triple Crown and the first in 37 years. The crowd that year was limited for the first time, to 90,000. His time of 2:26.65 was the sixth-fastest in Belmont Stakes history, and the second-fastest time for a Triple Crown winner. In 2018, Justify became the 13th Triple Crown winner and only the second horse to do so while undefeated.

The 152nd running of the Belmont Stakes took place without in-person fans on June 20, 2020, delayed from June 6 as a result of the COVID-19 pandemic. Leading to the announcement, NYRA considered various dates after evaluating the spring-summer meeting at Belmont Park and after the other three majors set their respective dates: the Kentucky Derby moving to September 5, the Preakness Stakes moving to October 3, and the Breeders' Cup Classic slated for November 7. Governor Andrew Cuomo of New York announced on May 16 that horse racing tracks statewide, including Belmont Park, would be permitted to resume races without in-person fans on June 1.

The 154th running of the Belmont Stakes was held on Saturday, June 11, 2022. Mo Donegal won with a time of 2:28.28. Principal owner was Jerry Crawford. Mo Donegal was trained by Todd Pletcher and ridden by Irad Ortiz, Jr.

Distance and race details 
The Belmont Stakes has been run at a mile and a half since 1926 (except 2020), having been run at that distance in 1874–1889.

The race has also been run at the following distances: a mile and five furlongs in 1867–1873; a mile and a quarter in 1890–1892, 1895, and 1904–1905; a mile and a furlong in 1893–1894 and again in 2020; and a mile and three furlongs from 1896 to 1903 and 1906–1925.

The purse for the first running in 1867 was $1,500 added, meaning the purse was supplemented by nomination and entry fees. This made the total purse $2,500, with the winner receiving $1,850. The purse increased sharply in the Roaring Twenties, from Man O'War's earnings of $7,950 in 1920 to Gallant Fox's take of $66,040 in 1930. Purses declined as a result of the Great Depression, with War Admiral earning only $28,020 in 1937, then began to recover. Throughout the sixties and early seventies, the value to the winner was roughly $100,000, depending on the added money generated by entry fees (larger fields thus leading to higher prize money). The purse was repeatedly raised in the eighties and nineties, reaching $500,000 added, with the winner receiving roughly $400,000. In 1998, the purse was changed to $1,000,000 guaranteed, with the winner receiving $600,000. In 2014, the purse was raised to $1,500,000.

With one exception, the race has been run at a level weight of 126 pounds (with a 5-pound allowance for fillies) since 1900. The 126 pounds comes from the English Classics, where the standard weight is 9 stone, with one stone equaling 14 pounds. In 1913, the Belmont was run as a handicap with the winner carrying only 109 pounds compared to the runner-up carrying 126 pounds. Races run prior to 1900 had varied weight conditions.

The first post parade in the United States was at the 14th Belmont, in 1880. Before 1921, the race was run in the clockwise tradition of English racing. Since then, the race has been run in the American, or counter-clockwise, direction.

Traditions 

The Belmont Stakes is traditionally called "The Test of the Champion" because it is by far the longest of the Triple Crown races (1.5 miles–a full lap around the enormous Belmont main track). It is also one of the longest first-class races on dirt in the United States. Most three-year-olds are unaccustomed to the distance, and lack the experience, if not the stamina, to maintain a winning speed for so long. In a long race such as the Belmont, positioning of the horse and the timing of the move to chase for the lead can be critical.

It is also known as "The Run for the Carnations" because the winning horse is draped with a blanket of white carnations after the race, in similar fashion to the blanket of roses and black-eyed Susans for the Derby and Preakness, respectively. The winning owner is ceremonially presented with the silver winner's trophy, designed by Paulding Farnham for Tiffany and Co. It was first presented to August Belmont Jr. in 1896 and donated by the Belmont family for annual presentation in 1926.

Despite the fact that the Belmont Stakes is the oldest of the Triple Crown races, its traditions have been more subject to change. Until 1996, the post parade song was "The Sidewalks of New York". From 1997 to 2009, the song was changed to a recording by Frank Sinatra of the "Theme from New York, New York" in an attempt to appeal to younger fans. In 2010, the song was changed to Jay-Z's "Empire State of Mind" sung by Jasmine V before reverting to "Theme from New York, New York" from 2011 through the present. This tradition is similar to the singing of the state song at the post parades of the first two Triple Crown races: "My Old Kentucky Home" at the Kentucky Derby and "Maryland, My Maryland" at the Preakness Stakes. The change of song gave rise to "the myth of Mamie O'Rourke", a reference to a character in the lyrics of "The Sidewalks of New York." Before American Pharoah won the Triple Crown in 2015, some claimed that changing the official Belmont song "cursed" the Triple Crown and was why no horse had won since Affirmed in 1978. Others note that there was no Triple Crown winner between 1979 and 1996, even though "Sidewalks" was still played.

Along with the change of song in 1997, the official drink was also changed, from the "White Carnation" to the "Belmont Breeze." The New York Times reviewed both cocktails unfavorably, calling the Belmont Breeze "a significant improvement over the nigh undrinkable White Carnation" despite the fact that it "tastes like a refined trashcan punch". In 2011, the Belmont Breeze was again changed to the current official drink known as the "Belmont Jewel."

While the origin of the white carnation as the official flower of the Belmont Stakes is unknown, traditionally, pure white carnations stand for love and luck. It takes approximately 700 "select" carnations imported from Colombia to create the 40-pound blanket draped over the winner of the Belmont Stakes. The NYRA has long used The Pennock Company, a wholesale florist based in Philadelphia to import the carnations used for the mantle.

Records 

Speed record:
 2:24 flat – Secretariat (1973;  miles). Secretariat also holds the fastest -, -, 1- and -mile fractions in Belmont history.
2:14.20 – Man o' War (1920;  miles)
2:56 flat – Harry Bassett (1871;  miles)
1:46.53 – Tiz the Law (2020;  miles)
2:06.60 – Delhi (1904;  miles)

Biggest Margin of Victory:
 31 lengths – Secretariat (1973)
25 lengths – Count Fleet (1943)
20 lengths – Man o' War (1920)

Most wins by a jockey:
 6 – Jim McLaughlin (1882, 1883, 1884, 1886, 1887, 1888)
 6 – Eddie Arcaro (1941, 1942, 1945, 1948, 1952, 1955)

Most wins by a trainer:
 8 – James G. Rowe Sr. (1883, 1884, 1901, 1904, 1907, 1908, 1910, 1913)

Most wins by an owner:
 6 – Belair Stud (1930, 1932, 1935, 1936, 1939, 1955)
 6 – James R. Keene (1879, 1901, 1904, 1907, 1908, 1910)

Trivia 
 Only James G. Rowe Sr. and George M. Odom have won the Belmont Stakes as both jockey and trainer.
 On June 5, 1993, thoroughbred racing's all-time leading female jockey, Julie Krone, became the first woman to win a Triple Crown race when she rode to victory in the Belmont Stakes aboard Colonial Affair.
 In 1984, Sarah Lundy became the first female trainer to saddle a horse in the Belmont Stakes, sending out Minstrel Star, who finished eleventh.
 The 2004 race had the biggest attendance in the park's history with 120,139.
 Sarava, at odds of 70–1, upset War Emblem's bid for the Triple Crown.
 Braulio Baeza has the distinction of winning three Belmont Stakes over three different surfaces. He won in his Belmont Stakes debut on 65 to 1 long-shot Sherluck in 1961 at the old Belmont Park, won in 1963 on Chateaugay when the race was run at Aqueduct, and won in 1969 on Arts and Letters at the new Belmont Park.
 Prior to the 2016 running, bay horses had the most victories with 56. Chestnuts were close behind with 54 wins, followed by 33 dark bay/browns. Only three gray/roan horses had won (Belmar in 1895, Native Dancer in 1953, and High Echelon in 1970). In 2016, gray horses swept the top three positions.
 Fifteen Belmont Stakes winners have sired at least one Belmont winner. Leading this list is Man o' War, who sired three subsequent winners — American Flag, Crusader and Triple Crown winner War Admiral.
 Twenty-three horses missed their chance at a Triple Crown by not winning the Belmont. Eight of these finished second: Pensive (1944), Tim Tam (1958), Forward Pass (1968), Majestic Prince (1969), Sunday Silence (1989), Silver Charm (1997), Real Quiet (1998), and Smarty Jones (2004). Five finished third: Northern Dancer (1964), Spectacular Bid (1979), Pleasant Colony (1981), Charismatic (1999), and Funny Cide (2003). Four finished fourth: Kauai King (1966), Canonero II (1971), Alysheba (1987), and California Chrome (2014). Carry Back (1961) finished seventh, War Emblem (2002) finished eighth and Big Brown (2008) did not finish. Finally, three Derby/Preakness winners did not race in the Belmont: Burgoo King (1932), Bold Venture (1936) and I'll Have Another (2012), though I'll Have Another was injured and was scratched the day before his Belmont Stakes in 2012.
 In June 1971, mentalist The Amazing Kreskin predicted that the winner of the next Belmont Stakes "would have an S in the third or fourth letter of his name." The winning horse that year was Pass Catcher.

Fillies in the Belmont 
Only 24 fillies have run in the Belmont; three of which have won:
 1867 – Ruthless
 1905 – Tanya
 2007 – Rags to Riches

This gives them a respectable 13% win rate when entered. For context, three fillies have won the Kentucky Derby while six have won the Preakness Stakes. On average, fillies have won between 2% and 3% of the Triple Crown races, with similar numbers for geldings; while about 95% of these races have been won by colts. The last filly as of June 11, 2022 to run in the Belmont was in 2022 when Nest ran second (placed) behind the winner her stable mate Mo Donegal.

Foreign-born winners 
 1874 – Saxon 
 1898 – Bowling Brook 
 1917 – Hourless 
 1918 – Johren 
 1957 – Gallant Man 
 1958 – Cavan 
 1960 – Celtic Ash 
 1990 – Go And Go 
 1998 – Victory Gallop

Winners since 1867 
Triple Crown winners are in bold.

 Note: Timed to the  second 1867 to 1901 and 1903, and to the  second in 1902 and from 1904 to 1991. Decimal timing, to the nearest , is now used, though race calls and many charts still use fifths.

A † designates a filly.

Sire lines 

 the Darley Arabian (1700c) sire line (all branched through the Eclipse (1764) line) produced 122 Stakes winners (117 colts, 2 geldings, 3 fillies), including all winners from 2009 to present. The main branches of this sire line are:
 the Joe Andrews (1778) branch produced 1 winner (most recently Saxon in 1874)
 the King Fergus (1775) branch (all branched through the Voltigeur (1847) line), produced 15 winners. His sire line continued primarily through his son Vedette (1854) with 13 winners, due primarily to his son Galopin (1872) with 10 winners (exclusively through St. Simon (1881), most recently Colonial Affair in 1993)
 the Potoooooooo (1773) branch produced 106 winners (all branched through the Waxy (1790) line). The primary branch of this sire line is through Whalebone (1807), which has produced 104 winners. In turn, the primary branch continues through Sir Hercules (1826), which has produced 82 winners, and then the Birdcatcher (1833) branch which produced 76 winners. From Birdcatcher, the branch of The Baron (1842) has produced 68 winners (nearly exclusively through the Stockwell (1849) line with 67 winners). Birdcatcher's grandson Doncaster (1870) sired Bend Or (1877), whose sire line accounts for 62 winners. The main branch of the Bend Or sire line continued through his son Bona Vista (1889) with 54 winners, exclusively through the Phalaris (1913) line, which has dominated in the last several decades (including all winners from 2009 to present) through the following sons:
the Pharamond (1925) branch (1 winner, most recently Capot in 1949);
the Sickle (1924) branch (23 winners exclusively through Native Dancer (1950) with his win in the 1953 Belmont Stakes, continued primarily through his son Raise a Native (1961) with 20 winners, down through Mr Prospector (1970) with 17 winners through 11 different sons: Conquistador Cielo, with his win in the 1982 Belmont Stakes, and 10 other sons through their progeny (most recently American Pharoah (through Mr Prospector's son Fappiano (1977) with 5 winners) in 2018));
the Pharos (1920) branch, which has produced all winners from 2016 to present (30 winners all branched through the Nearco (1935) line, through his sons Mossborough (1947), Royal Charger (1942), Nearctic (1954), and Nasrullah (1940)). The Mossborough branch produced 1 winner (most recently Cavan in 1958), The Royal Charger branch produced 4 winners (most recently Temperence Hill in 1980), the Nearctic branch produced 9 winners (nearly exclusively through his son Northern Dancer (1961) with 8 winners, most recently Sir Winston in 2019), while the Nasrullah branch produced 16 winners (most recently Mo Donegal in 2022) primarily due to his son Bold Ruler (1954) with 13 winners primarily through his son Boldnesian (1963) with 9 winners (exclusively through the Seattle Slew (1974) line, with his win in the 1977 Belmont Stakes and 8 other progeny, nearly exclusively through A.P. Indy, winner of the 1992 Belmont Stakes and 6 other progeny winners, with 5 winners through A.P. Indy's son Pulpit (1994) (exclusively through Pulpit's son Tapit (2001)), most recently Essential Quality in 2021).
 Special notes:
 The Whalebone (1807) branch produced two main lines: the primary branch of Sir Hercules (1826), and the secondary branch of Camel (1822) which produced 18 winners (exclusively through the Touchstone (1831) line). The Camel branch continued primarily through two of this grandsons: the Newminster (1848) branch (8 winners, primarily through the Bay Ronald (1893) line with 6 winners, most recently Creme Fraiche in 1985) and the Orlando (1841) branch (9 winners, exclusively through the Eclipse (1855) line, most recently Shut Out in 1942).
 The Sir Hercules (1826) branch produced two main lines: the primary branch of Birdcatcher (1833), and the secondary branch of Faugh-a-Ballagh (1841) which produced 6 winners (exclusively through the Leamington (1853) line), most recently 1894 Belmont Stakes winner Henry of Navarre.
 The Birdcatcher (1833) branch produced two main lines: the primary branch of The Baron (1842), and the secondary branch of Oxford (1857) which produced 7 winners (exclusively through the Sterling (1868) line), most recently 1964 Belmont Stakes winner Quadrangle.
 The Bend Or (1877) branch produced two main lines: the primary branch of Bona Vista (1889), and the secondary branch of Ormonde (1883) which produced 7 winners (exclusively through the Teddy (1913) line), most recently 1967 Belmont Stakes winner Damascus.
 the Godolphin Arabian (1724c) sire line produced 18 colts. The main branches of this sire (all branched through the West Australian (1850) line) are:
 the Solon (1861) branch produced 2 winners (exclusively through the Ogden (1894) line, most recently Zev in 1923)
 the Australian (1858) branch produced 16 winners, including:
 Joe Daniels (1869), winner of the 1872 Belmont Stakes
 Springbok (1870), winner of the 1873 Belmont Stakes
the Abd-El-Kader (1865) branch produced 1 winner (most recently Algerine in 1876)
the Spendthrift (1876) branch produced 13 winners, including his win in the 1879 Belmont Stakes and 12 progeny including:
the Kingston (1884) branch produced 1 winner (most recently Ildrim in 1900)
the Hastings (1893) branch produced 11 winners (his win in the 1896 Belmont Stakes and 10 progeny, including 1902 Belmont Stakes winner Masterman (1899) and 9 winners through the Fair Play (1905) line, with 5 winners primarily through the Man o' War (1917) line, with his win in the 1920 Belmont Stakes plus 4 winners through his progeny, most recently Da'Tara in 2008)
 the Byerley Turk (1680c) sire line produced 14 winners (13 colts, 1 gelding). The main branches of this sire (all branched through the Herod (1758) line) are:
 the Florizel (1768) branch produced 7 winners (all branched through the Boston (1833) line). The main branches of this sire line are:
the Ringgold (1842) branch produced 1 winner (most recently Calvin in 1875)
the Lexington (1850) branch produced 6 winners (most recently Eric in 1889)
 the Woodpecker (1773) branch produced 7 winners (all branched through the Buzzard (1787) line). The main branches of this sire line are:
the Castrel (1801) branch produced 2 winners (all branched through the Pantaloon  (1824) line, most recently Huryoff in 1933)
the Selim (1802) branch produced 5 winners (all branched through the Sultan (1816) line). The main branches of this sire line are:
 the Bay Middleton (1833) branch produced 1 winner (most recently Amberoid in 1966)
the Glencoe (1831) branch produced 4 winners (all branched through the Hindoo (1878) line), including Hanover, winner of the 1887 Belmont Stakes and 3 other progeny (most recently Prince Eugene in 1913)

Belmont Stakes winners with male-line descendants including other Belmont Stakes winners
 Native Dancer (1953 winner) – 22 colts; most recently American Pharoah (2015)
 Spendthrift (1879 winner) – 12 colts; most recently Da' Tara (2008)
 Hastings (1896 winner) – 10 colts; most recently Da' Tara (2008)
 Seattle Slew (1977 winner) – 8 colts; most recently Essential Quality (2021)
 Commando (1901 winner) – 6 colts; most recently Shut Out (1942)
 A.P. Indy (1992 winner) – 6 colts; most recently Essential Quality (2021)
 Man o' War (1920 winner) – 4 colts; most recently Da' Tara (2008)
 Peter Pan (1907 winner) – 3 colts; most recently Shut Out (1942)
 Gallant Fox (1930 winner) – 2 colts; most recently Granville (1936)
 Count Fleet (1943 winner) – 2 colts; most recently One Count (1952)
 Duke of Magenta (1878 winner) – 1 colt; Eric (1889)
 Hanover (1887 winner) – 1 colt; Joe Madden (1909)
 The Finn (1915 winner) – 1 colt; Zev (1923)
 Chance Shot (1927 winner) – 1 colt; Peace Chance (1934)
 Friar Rock (1916 winner) – 1 colt; Phalanx (1947)
 Sword Dancer (1959 winner) – 1 colt; Damascus (1967)
 Secretariat (1973 winner) – 1 colt; Risen Star (1988)
 Thunder Gulch (1995 winner) – 1 colt; Point Given (2001)
 Birdstone (2004 winner) – 1 colt; Summer Bird (2009)
 Empire Maker (2003 winner) – 1 colt; American Pharoah (2015)

See also 

 American thoroughbred racing top attended events
 Belmont Stakes top three finishers
 Grand Slam of Thoroughbred Racing
 List of Belmont Stakes broadcasters
 Triple Crown of Thoroughbred Racing
 Triple Crown Productions

Explanatory notes

Citations

External links 

 
 Details of all past Belmont Stakes courtesy of the New York Racing Association
 Belmont Stakes History & Facts
 Ten Things You Should Know about the Belmont Stakes at Hello Race Fans!

 
1867 establishments in New York (state)
Annual sporting events in the United States
Belmont family
Belmont Park
Morris Park Racecourse
Flat horse races for three-year-olds
Grade 1 stakes races in the United States
Graded stakes races in the United States
Horse races in New York (state)
June sporting events
Recurring sporting events established in 1867
Sports in Long Island
Triple Crown of Thoroughbred Racing